Liechtenstein competed at the 1992 Summer Olympics in Barcelona, Spain. Seven competitors, four men and three women, took part in eight events in four sports.

Competitors
The following is the list of number of competitors in the Games.

Athletics

Men
Track and road events

Women
Combined events – Heptathlon

Cycling

Two cyclists, one man and one woman, represented Liechtenstein in 1992.

Road

Track
Pursuit

Points race

Judo

Men

Women

Shooting

Men

References

External links
Official Olympic Reports

Nations at the 1992 Summer Olympics
1992
1992 in Liechtenstein sport